Artakul (Ärtäkül) is a rural locality (a selo) and the administrative centre of Artakulsky Selsoviet, Karaidelsky District, Bashkortostan, Russia. The population was 470 as of 2010. There are 5 streets.

Geography 
Artakul is located 40 km west of Karaidel (the district's administrative centre) by road. Abutalipovo is the nearest rural locality.

References 

Rural localities in Karaidelsky District